Gitana 16, her name when launched, is an IMOCA 60 monohull sailing yacht, designed by VPLP and Guillaume Verdier and constructed by Multiplast in France. She was later known as Malizia II. The yacht's hull has a tumblehome shape and is equipped with foils, which were upgraded in 2016 and again in 2020. The boat was commissioned for the Gitana Sailing Team founded by Benjamin de Rothschild. Her first skipper was Sébastien Josse who was later replaced by Boris Herrmann. The yacht does not use any fossil fuel for power. In 2019, solar panels with an output of 1.3kw were installed, and power is also generated by two hydro-electric generators at the stern that can be raised and lowered as needed.

Ownership

2015–2017 - Gitana 16, FRA 16
The yacht was commissioned for the Gitana Sailing Team, founded by Benjamin de Rothschild. She competed in the 2016–2017 Vendée Globe with French Skipper Sébastien Josse  but did not finish the race, due to a foil shaft problem.

2017–2021 - Malizia II, MON 10 
In 2016, Pierre Casiraghi, Vice-President of the Yacht Club de Monaco, worked with his friend Boris Herrmann of Germany and others to create Team Malizia. The yacht was renamed and competed for the team under the name Malizia II, with the sail number MON 10, flagged by  Seaexplorer-Yacht Club de Monaco for the 2020-2021 Vendée Globe.

2021 to date: Fortinet-Best Western, FRA 10 
In March 2020, Romain Attanasio of France bought the yacht, following a repair and refit, with the intention of competing in the 2024-2025 Vendée Globe.

Voyages

Racing History

2020–2021 Vendée Globe
With skipper Boris Herrmann the boat competed in the 2020–2021 Vendée Globe finishing 5th after having to reduce its speed close to Les Sables due to a collision with a fishing vessel which caused extensive damage to the starboard foil and side. Herrmann helped with the rescue of Kevin Escoffier after his boat sank.

Greta Thunberg Transatlantic Voyage
In August 2019 the Malizia II took Swedish climate activist Greta Thunberg across the North Atlantic Ocean from Plymouth to New York City without producing any carbon dioxide during the voyage, however, France 24 reported that several crew flew to New York to sail the yacht back to Europe. The trip was led by Boris Herrmann. Thunberg's crossing of the Atlantic started on 14 August 2019 and she arrived on 28 August.
See also
2019 UN Climate Action Summit
Voyage of Greta Thunberg

References

External links
 Team Malizia II, official website
 Live-tracking During Greta Thunberg's crossing of the Atlantic, August 2019

2010s sailing yachts
2015 ships
Sailing yachts designed by VPLP
Sailboat types built in France
IMOCA 60
Vendée Globe boats